Callum Braley (born 23 March 1994) is an English rugby union player who plays for Northampton Saints in the Premiership Rugby.

Braley played his early rugby with St Mary's Old Boys RFC. His first taste of senior rugby came when he made his full debut at the age of 17, playing in two British and Irish Cup games for his home city club Bristol against Cornish Pirates and Ayr.

Braley has been an England age group international from U16 level upwards where, selected for England U20s, his team won the 2013 IRB Junior World Championship with a 23–15 win over Wales in the final held at Vannes, France. He also skippered the successful defence of England U20s Junior World Championship at the 2014 IRB Junior World Championship.

On 18 June 2014, Braley left Bristol to sign for Gloucester Rugby from the 2014–15 season.

In 2019, Braley gained his first senior international caps for Italy off the bench against Ireland and Russia in World Cup warm-up matches. Italy's final warm-up match gave Braley his first start against England. Braley qualifies for the Italian team through his Italian grandfather.

Braley was part of the Italy squad for the 2019 Rugby World Cup, and the 2020 Six Nations Championship. He has represented Italy on over 15 occasions with a try from 2019 to 2022.

Braley left Gloucester for Pro14 side Benetton at the end of the 2019–20 season. He played with Benetton until the 2021–22 season.

On 23 February 2022, Braley returns to England to join Northampton Saints back in the Premiership Rugby ahead of the 2022-23 season.

Career honours 

England U20
 2013 IRB Junior World Championship champions
 2014 IRB Junior World Championship champions
 2013 Six Nations Under 20s Championship champions
 2014 Six Nations Under 20s Championship triple crown

References

External links
Gloucester Rugby Profile

England Profile

1994 births
Living people
Italy international rugby union players
English rugby union players
English people of Italian descent
Rugby union scrum-halves
Gloucester Rugby players
Bristol Bears players
Rugby union players from Bristol
Hartpury University R.F.C. players
Benetton Rugby players
People educated at Colston's School